Primorsk is a town in Baltiysky District of Kaliningrad Oblast, Russia, located on the Vistula Lagoon.

Geography
The town is located in the southwest of the Sambia Peninsula.

History
The site has been associated with the name of St. Adalbert of Prague, who was sent with soldiers of Bolesław I the Brave of the newly established Poland to Christianize Prussia. St. Adalbert was beheaded nearby in 997 by the pagan Sambians after he destroyed their sacred oak grove. Several further attempts of conquest by Poles followed, but were successfully repelled. In 1254 Sambia was conquered by forces of the Teutonic Order, led by King Ottokar II of Bohemia, during the Prussian Crusade. 

Upon the division of the conquered lands, the Bishop of Sambia had a castle erected at the site named Schonewik (derived from Old Prussian: Skanevīs). First mentioned in a 1268 deed, it is one of the oldest in the region. A settlement was laid out from 1299 onwards and its citizens, mainly descending from Stralsund in the Danish Principality of Rügen, received a first town charter in 1305. As the episcopal residence of the Sambian bishops, it was called Bischoveshusen or shortly Vischhusen from about 1325. The richly endowed Gothic parish church was one of the oldest in the province.

In 1454, King Casimir IV Jagiellon incorporated the region to the Kingdom of Poland upon the request of the anti-Teutonic Prussian Confederation. After the subsequent Thirteen Years' War (1454–1466), it became a part of Poland as a fief held by the Teutonic Knights. When in 1525 Bishop George of Polentz waived his rights, his Fischhausen residence was incorporated into the secular Duchy of Prussia, a newly formed vassal duchy of Poland. On 12 February 1526, the Hohenzollern duke Albert, former Grand Master of the Teutonic Knights, married Princess Dorothea of Denmark at the Fischhausen Castle chapel. The fortress became the residence of his mentally disabled son Albert Frederick until his death in 1618. Afterwards, the castle decayed. From the 18th century, the town formed part of the Kingdom of Prussia and the castle was finally demolished by order of King Frederick I of Prussia, who had its stones used for the expansion of the nearby Pillau fortress. 

Upon the re-organisation of the Prussian lands after the Congress of Vienna, Fischhausen became the administrative seat of a district (Kreis Fischhausen) within the Province of East Prussia in 1818. A station on the East Prussian Southern Railway line from Königsberg to Pillau with a branch-off to Palmnicken (Yantarny) on the Amber Coast was inaugurated in 1865. From 1871, the town formed part of the German Empire. According to the German 1939 census, the town's population was 3,879.

During World War II, the Soviet Red Army advanced towards Fischhausen after the capture of Königsberg. The town was captured after a battle on April 21–24, 1945; during the fighting the medieval town was almost completely destroyed. After the war, the town was transferred to Soviet control and in 1946 it was given its present name (which literally means "by the sea" in Russian). It finally lost its status as a district seat and was incorporated into Zelenogradsky District in 1947. Part of the newly established Baltiysky District since 1996, it was demoted in status to that of an urban-type settlement in 2005. In 2008, its town status was restored.

Administrative and municipal status
Within the framework of administrative divisions, it is incorporated within Baltiysky District as the town of district significance of Primorsk. As a municipal division, the town of district significance of Primorsk is incorporated within Baltiysky Municipal District as Primorskoye Urban Settlement.

Notable people
Arthur von Hippel (1841–1916), ophthalmologist
Wilhelm Wien (1864–1928), physicist
Dietrich von Saucken (1892–1980), general
Marie Jonas (1893–1944), physician
Arno Motulsky (1923–2018), physician and geneticist

References

Notes

Sources

Cities and towns in Kaliningrad Oblast